This list of fossil molluscs described in 2023 is a list of new taxa of fossil molluscs that were described during the year 2023, as well as other significant discoveries and events related to molluscan paleontology that occurred in 2023.

Ammonites

Ammonite research
 A study on the swimming capabilities of ammonites, aiming to determine hydrodynamic costs and advantages provided by different conch geometries, is published by Ritterbush & Hebdon (2023).
 Shigeta & Maeda (2023) describe new fossil material of ammonites from the Maastrichtian Krasnoyarka Formation (Sakhalin, Russia), including fossils of Zelandites varuna, Gaudryceras seymouriense, Pachydiscus subcompressus and Anagaudryceras mikobokense, and interpret the presence of these species as indicative of the influx of immigrant ammonite species into the Northwest Pacific region during late Maastrichtian, which might have been associated with cooling after the greenhouse Middle Maastrichtian Event.

Other cephalopods

Other cephalopod research

Bivalves

Bivalve research

Gastropods

Gastropod research

Other molluscs

Other mollusc research
 Qiang et al. (2023) describe new fossil material of Anabarella plana from the Cambrian Yanjiahe Formation (China), and consider A. plana to be the only member of the genus Anabarella definitely present in South China.

General research
 A diverse molluscan assemblage dominated by turritellid gastropods from Kachchh (India), originally interpreted as Late Jurassic in age, is reinterpreted as more likely Miocene in age by Fürsich et al. (2023).

References 

2023 in paleontology
Paleomalacology